Richard Jean Monette CM, DHum, LLD (June 19, 1944 – September 9, 2008), was a Canadian actor and director, best known for his 14-season tenure as the longest-serving artistic director of the Stratford Festival of Canada from 1994 to 2007.

Early life
Monette was born in Montreal, the son of Florence M. (née Tondino) and Maurice Monette. He was educated at Loyola High School (Montreal) and Loyola College (now Concordia University).

Monette was the nephew of Canadian painter Gentile Tondino.

Theatre career
It was at college that his acting skills were first noticed when he took top acting honours at the 1959 Hart House Inter-Varsity Drama competition in Toronto.

Upon graduation, he chose to pursue an acting career, and his first professional role was as a 19-year-old Hamlet at the Crest Theatre in Toronto. He joined the Stratford Festival Company in 1965, and played a variety of small roles. He also won a role in Soldiers at the Royal Alexandra Theatre, a production that took him to Broadway. He also appeared in a number of television plays on CBC.

In 1969, he moved to London, England, and appeared in a variety of productions, including open-air Shakespeare in Regent's Park, and the original London production of the notorious Oh! Calcutta!.

Upon his return to Canada in 1974, he took on the title role in the premiere of the English translation of Michel Tremblay's Hosanna at the Tarragon Theatre. His definitive interpretation of the conflicted transvestite obsessed with Elizabeth Taylor's Cleopatra marked his arrival as one of Canada's leading actors. In his memoir, he recalled it as "a great role, perhaps the best I have ever played, outside of Shakespeare".

He also returned to the Stratford Company, taking on the role of Hamlet, and for the next ten years, he would be one of Stratford's main leading men. He also appeared in a number of Canadian films, including I've Heard the Mermaids Singing and Dancing in the Dark.

Monette fought a lifelong battle with stage fright, and gradually refocused his energies from acting to directing. Although he had directed a short play at Stratford in 1978, his first full-length Stratford production was Taming of the Shrew at Stratford in 1988, which was an unexpected hit with audiences. Critic Richard Ouzounian believes this production served as a foundation for Monette's career as a director, calling it "a joyous romp in which the Fellinesque setting of Rome in the 1950s meshed marvelously with Shakespeare's text and the performances of Goldie Semple and Colm Feore".

Monette was selected as Artistic Director Designate of Stratford in 1992, and subsequently named artistic director in 1994. During his tenure, he not only staged every one of Shakespeare's plays, he also showcased big-production musicals such as My Fair Lady and Anything Goes. Although critics argued that the musicals were too populist, Monette erased the Festival's considerable financial deficit and brought in new audiences. His other legacies at Stratford include the Birmingham Conservatory acting school, a $50 million endowment fund, and the opening of a fourth theatre, the 260-seat Studio Theatre.

He also continued to take on occasional acting roles; in 1996, he appeared in the TV movie And Then There was One.

A little over a year after his retirement, he died of a pulmonary embolism.  He was buried at the Avondale Cemetery in Stratford, Ontario.

Partial filmography
Big Zapper (1973) – Rock Hard
Find the Lady (1976) – Bruce La Rousse
Iceman (1984) – Hogan
Dancing in the Dark (1986) – The doctor
I've Heard the Mermaids Singing (1987) – Clive
Hello Mary Lou: Prom Night II (1987) – Father Cooper
Higher Education (1988) – Robert Bley

References

External links

1944 births
2008 deaths
Canadian expatriates in the United Kingdom
Canadian male film actors
Canadian people of Italian descent
Loyola College (Montreal) alumni
Francophone Quebec people
Male actors from Montreal
Deaths from pulmonary embolism
Members of the Order of Canada
Canadian artistic directors